Colotis danae, the crimson tip or scarlet tip, is a small butterfly of the family Pieridae, that is, the yellows and whites. It is found in Asia and Africa.

Description
Colouration very variable, especially in the female, from orange to red.

Male

Upperside: white, base of wings generally irrorated (speckled), but to a varying extent, with black scales. This irroration in many specimens is entirely wanting. Forewing: with or without a minute black spot on the discocellulars; apex broadly carmine, edged internally and externally with black, this black border varies in width, but both inner and outer borders meet on the costa and on the termen, on the latter they unite and sometimes extend as a black line to the tornus. Hindwing: uniform, except for a series of black terminal spots, which in some specimens are comparatively large and connected together by an anteciliary slender black line, in others minute, more or less obsolescent, unconnected dots.

Underside: white. Forewing: base of cell washed with sulphur-yellow; spot on discocellulars as on the upperside; apical carmine area of the upperside represented by an ochraceous-pink patch, not margined with black, but similar in shape and position; in some specimens this is more or less suffused with greyish scales; in all, it is crossed near its inner edge by an obliquely placed series of four or five spots that vary in colour from pale ferruginous to black. In some specimens there are two terminal diffuse black spots, one each at the ends of veins 2 and 3. Hindwing: the ground colour generally lightly, often heavily, suffused with ochraceous pink, sometimes pure white; a small spot on the discocellulars pale ferruginous to black, sometimes annular and centred with carmine; followed by a curved macular discal band that also varies in colour from pale ferruginous to black and has the posterior spots often obsolescent, or even completely absent; a series of minute black dots at the apices of the veins that runs to the termen, and may or may not be connected by a slender black anteciliary line. Antennae pale brown, speckled with white; head, thorax and abdomen black; head and thorax anteriorly clothed with brown, sometimes greyish-black hairs; beneath: palpi, thorax and abdomen white.

Female
Upperside: white; base of wings lightly, often heavily, irrorated with greyish-black scales. In some specimens the irroration is very scanty, in others it occupies fully a third of the wings from base and extends as a broad band parallel to the dorsum on the hindwing. Forewing: an apical carmine patch as in the male but smaller, sometimes reduced to a mere row of preapical pale rosy streaks, but always bordered externally, and generally internally also, by black of varying width. In some specimens the inner black border is very narrow, in others broad, and in a very few entirely absent. The outer border again in some specimens is inwardly festooned, and may be either broad or comparatively narrow. Discocellular spot as in the male but larger, followed by an anterior, postdiscal, macular, curved, black band, the upper spots of which cross the carmine area, or when the carmine area is reduced to short streaks the band crosses the black internal edging to it, showing up in a darker tint than the edging itself; lastly, a black transverse, somewhat diffuse, spot in interspaces 1 and 2. Hindwing: with a dusky spot on the discocellulars, a black, macular, discal, curved, more or less incomplete band, and a terminal row of black spots that in some specimens are connected and form a continuous band. All these markings are generally diffuse.

Underside, forewing: white, suffused with sulphur yellow at base of cell and with ochraceous (in some specimens ochraceous grey, in others ochraceous red) on apical area; spot on discocellulars, the postdiscal macular band and spots in interspaces 1 and 2 as on the upperside, but more clearly defined, the spots that compose the postdiscal band sometimes annular. Hindwing: white, suffused to a greater or less degree with, ochraceous, sometimes pink; spot on discocellulars and discal macular band as on the upperside, but both the discocellular spot and the spots that compose the latter more clearly defined, annular and generally centred with carmine; a terminal row of black specks which may or may not be connected by a very slender anteciliary line.

Wingspan of 45–50 mm in males and 48–52 mm in females.

Distribution
Baluchistan, western and southern India, Sri Lanka, Mauritania, Senegal, the Gambia, Mali, Burkina Faso, Ivory Coast, Iran, Ghana, Nigeria, Niger, Chad, Sudan, Ethiopia, Arabia, Somalia, Uganda, Kenya, Tanzania, Angola, Malawi, Zambia, Mozambique, Zimbabwe, Botswana, Namibia, South Africa, Eswatini and United Arab Emirates.

Subspecies
C. d. danae — India, Sri Lanka
C. d. annae (Wallengren, 1857) — Malawi, southern and eastern Zambia, Mozambique, Zimbabwe, north-eastern Botswana, north-eastern Namibia, South Africa, Eswatini
C. d. dulcis (Butler, 1876) — Persian Gulf
C. d. eupompe (Klug, 1829) — Mauritania, Senegal, Gambia, Mali, Burkina Faso, Ivory Coast, Ghana, northern Nigeria, Niger, Chad, Sudan, Ethiopia, Somalia, Kenya, United Arab Emirates, to southern and western Arabia
C. d. pseudacaste (Butler, 1876) — Ethiopia, Somalia, Uganda, south-eastern Kenya, Tanzania
C. d. walkeri (Butler, 1884) — south-western Angola, north-western Namibia

Habits, behaviour, life cycle
The larval food plants include the genera Cadaba, Capparis and Maerua (all in the family Capparaceae).

References

Pieridae
List of butterflies of India
List of butterflies of India (Pieridae)

danae
Butterflies of Asia
Butterflies of Africa
Butterflies described in 1775
Taxa named by Johan Christian Fabricius